This is a list of administrative subdivisions and populated places of the lands of New Hampshire, United States.

See also US Geographic Names Information System query.

Counties 

Counties are administratively divided into towns, cities, and unincorporated areas.

:Category:New Hampshire counties (10 counties).

Populated places 

Populated places in New Hampshire generally fall into one or more of the following categories (which see):
:Category:Cities in New Hampshire (13 cities)
:Category:Towns in New Hampshire (221 towns)
:Category:Census-designated places in New Hampshire (46 places)
:Category:Unincorporated communities in New Hampshire (villages, hamlets, settlements, etc.)

Other places 

In New Hampshire, locations, grants, townships (which are different from towns), and purchases are unincorporated portions of a county which are not part of any town and have limited self-government (if any, as many are uninhabited).
:Category:Townships in New Hampshire (25 listed, including 9 Grants, 4 Locations and 6 Purchases)

There are also several tourism regions identified by the NH Division of Travel and Tourism:
Dartmouth-Lake Sunapee Region (aka Upper Valley)
Great North Woods
Lakes Region
Merrimack Valley Region
Monadnock Region
Seacoast Region
White Mountains Region

For further information about geographic locations and features (mountains, rivers, lakes, hiking trails, etc.) in New Hampshire, please refer to :Category:Geography of New Hampshire.

List of places

A

Acworth
Albany
Alderbrook - in Bethlehem
Alexandria
Allens Mills - in Gilmanton
Allenstown
Alstead
Alstead Center
Alton
Alton Bay
Ames - in Gilford
Amherst
Andover
Antrim
Antrim Center
Appalachia - in Randolph
Apthorp - in Littleton
Arlington Park - in Salem
Ashland
Ashuelot - in Winchester
Atkinson
Atkinson and Gilmanton Academy Grant
Atkinson Depot
Atkinson Heights
Atlantic - in Seabrook
Atlantic Heights - in Portsmouth*Auburn
Austin Corners - in Kensington

B

Baglett Grove - in Hampstead
Bagley - in Warner
Bailey's - former railroad station and hamlet in Jefferson
Baileys Corner - in Dunbarton
Baker Corner - in Marlow
Balloch - in Cornish
Bank - in New Ipswich
Barnstead
Barrett - in Lisbon
Barrington
Bartlett
Bath
Bay Meetinghouse - in Sanbornton
Bayside - in Greenland
Bean Island - in Candia
Bean's Grant
Bean's Purchase
Bear Island - island community in Meredith
Beatties - in Stratford
Bedford
Beebe River - community in Campton
Beechwood Corner - in Fitzwilliam
Belmont
Bennett Corners - in Tamworth
Bennington
Benton
Berlin
Berrys Corner - in Strafford
Bersum Gardens - in Portsmouth
Bethlehem
Big Rock Corner - in Sandwich
Blackwater - in Somersworth
Blair - in Campton
Blodgett Landing - in Newbury
Bonds Corner - in Dublin
Boscawen
Boston Harbor - in Dover
Boutin Corner - in Benton
Bow
Bow Bog
Bow Center
Bow Junction
Bow Lake Village - in Strafford
Bow Mills
Bowkerville - in Fitzwilliam
Bowman - in Randolph
Box Corner - in Bradford
Boyce - in Canterbury
Bradford
Bradford Center
Breakfast Hill - in Greenland
Breezy Point - in Warren
Brentwood
Brentwood Corners
Bretton Woods - in Carroll
Brick School Corner - in Kensington
Bridgewater
Bristol
Broad Acres - in Nashua
Brookfield
Brookhurst - in Alton
Brookline
Browns Corner - in Goffstown
Bucks Corner - in Dorchester
Bungy - in Columbia
Burkehaven - in Sunapee

C

Cable Road - in Rye
Cambridge
Camp Gundalow - in Greenland
Camp Hale - in Sandwich
Camp Hedding - in Epping
Campton
Campton Hollow
Campton Lower Village
Campton Station
Campton Upper Village
Canaan
Canaan Center
Canaan Street
Candia
Candia Four Corners
Candia Station
Canobie Lake - in Salem
Canterbury
Canterbury Station
Carroll
Cascade - on the line between Gorham and Berlin
Cedar Waters - in Nottingham
Cemetery Corners - in North Hampton
Center Barnstead - in Barnstead
Center Conway - in Conway
Center Effingham - in Effingham
Center Harbor
Center Haverhill - in Haverhill
Center Ossipee - in Ossipee
Center Sandwich - in Sandwich
Center Strafford - in Strafford
Center Tuftonboro - in Tuftonboro
Central Park - in Somersworth
Chandlers Mills - in Newport
Chandler's Purchase
Charlestown
Chase Village - in Weare
Chases Grove - in Derry
Chases Mill - in Effingham
Chatham
Cheever - in Dorchester
Chesham - in Harrisville
Chester
Chesterfield
Chichester
Chicks Corner - in Sandwich
Chickville - in Ossipee
Chocorua - in Tamworth
Christian Hollow - in Walpole
Christian Shore - in Portsmouth
Cilleyville - in Andover
Claremont
Claremont Junction
Clark Landing - in Moultonborough
Clarksville
Clinton Grove - in Weare
Clinton Village - in Antrim
Cluffs Crossing - in Salem
Coburn - in New Durham
Cocheco - in Dover
Coffins Mill - in Hampton
Colby - in Henniker
Cold River - in Walpole
Colebrook
Collettes Grove - in Derry
Columbia
Concord
Concord Heights
Cones - in Columbia
Conleys Grove - on Derry/Atkinson town line
Contoocook - in Hopkinton
Converseville - in Rindge
Conway
Cooks Crossing - in Bartlett
Coos Junction - in Lancaster
Copperville - in Milan
Cornish
Cornish Center
Cornish City
Cornish Flat
Cornish Mills
Cowbell Corners - in Salem
Crane Crossing - in Newton
Crawford's Purchase
Creek Area - in Portsmouth
Crescent Lake - community in Acworth
Cricket Corner - in Amherst
Crockett Corner - in New London
Crocketts Crossing - in Somersworth
Croydon
Croydon Flat
Croydon Four Corners
Crystal - in Stark
Curtis Corner - in Lyndeborough
Curtis Corner - in Winchester
Cushman - in Dalton
Cutt's Grant
Cutter Hill - in Rindge

D

Dalton
Danbury
Danville
Davis - in New Durham
Davis - in New Ipswich
Davisville - in Warner
Davisville - in Wilton
Deephaven - in Holderness
Deerfield
Deerfield - in Bethlehem
Deerfield Center
Deerfield Parade
Deering
Derry
Derry Village
Dexter Corner - in New Durham
Dimond - in Warner
Dingit Corner - in Webster
Dix's Grant
Dixville
Dixville Notch
Dockham Shore - in Gilford
Dodge Hollow - in Lempster
Dodge Tavern - in Walpole
Dole Junction - in Hinsdale
Dorchester
Dorrs Corner - in Ossipee
Dover
Dows Corner - in Exeter
Drewsville - in Walpole
Drury - in Peterborough
Dublin
Ducks Head - in Jackson
Dummer
Dunbarton
Dunbarton Center
Dundee - in Jackson
Durham

E

East Acworth - in Acworth
East Alstead - in Alstead
East Alton - in Alton
East Andover - in Andover
East Barrington - in Barrington
East Bear Island - in Meredith
East Candia - in Candia
East Concord - in Concord
East Conway - in Conway
East Deering - in Deering
East Derry - in Derry
East Freedom - in Freedom
East Grafton - in Grafton
East Grantham - in Grantham
East Hampstead - in Hampstead
East Haverhill - in Haverhill
East Hebron - in Hebron
East Holderness - in Holderness
East Kingston
East Lempster - in Lempster
East Madison - in Madison
East Merrimack - in Merrimack
East Milford - in Milford
East Plainfield - in Plainfield
East Rindge - in Rindge
East Rochester - in Rochester
East Sandwich - in Sandwich
East Springfield - in Springfield
East Sullivan - in Sullivan
East Sutton - in Sutton
East Swanzey - in Swanzey
East Tilton - in Tilton
East Unity - in Unity
East Wakefield - in Wakefield
East Washington - in Washington
East Westmoreland - in Westmoreland
East Wilder - in Lebanon
East Wolfeboro - in Wolfeboro
Eastman - in Grantham
Eastman Corners - in Kensington
Eastman Point - in Hampton
Easton
Eastview - in Harrisville
Eaton
Eaton Center
Edgemont - in Newbury
Effingham
Effingham Falls
Elkins - in New London
Ellisville - in Sullivan
Ellsworth
Elmwood - in Danbury
Elmwood - in Hancock
Elmwood Corners - in Hampton
Elwyn Park - in Portsmouth
Enfield
Enfield Center
Epping
Epsom
Errol
Erving's Location
Etna - in Hanover
Exeter

F

Fabyan - in Carroll
Fairhill Manor - in Rye
Fairview - in Woodstock
Farmington
Federal Corner - in Tuftonboro
Fernald - in Wolfeboro
Ferncroft - in Albany
Fernwood - in Sunapee
Fish Market - in Enfield
Fitzwilliam
Fitzwilliam Depot
Five Corners - in Bethlehem
Five Corners - in Kensington
Fogg Corner - in North Hampton
Fogg Corners - in Hampton Falls
Fords Crossing - in Danbury
Fords Mill - in Danbury
Forristalls Corner - in Alstead
Foster Corners - in Salem
Foundry - in Somersworth
Four Corners - in Freedom
Four Corners - in Newmarket
Foyes Corner - in Rye
Francestown
Franconia
Franklin
Freedom
Fremont
Fremont Station

G

Gardners Grove - in Belmont
Gates Corner - in Dover
Gaza - in Sanbornton
Gee Mill - in Marlow
Georges - in Columbia
Georges Mills - in Sunapee
Gerrish - in Boscawen
Gerrish Corner - in Webster
Gibson Four Corners - in New Ipswich
Gilboa - in Westmoreland
Gilford
Gilmans Corner - in Orford
Gilmanton
Gilmanton Ironworks - in Gilmanton
Gilsum
Glen - in Bartlett
Glen House - in Green's Grant
Glencliff - in Warren
Glendale - in Gilford
Glenmere Village - in Lee
Goffs Falls - in Manchester
Goffstown
Gonic - in Rochester
Gooch Corner - in Exeter
Goodrich Falls - in Bartlett
Goose Corner - in Wolfeboro
Goose Hollow - in Thornton
Gorham
Goshen
Goshen Four Corners
Gosport - in Rye (the Isles of Shoals)
Gossville - in Epsom
Grafton
Grafton Center
Grange - in Lancaster
Granite - in Ossipee
Granliden - in Sunapee
Grantham
Grape Corner - in Effingham
Grasmere - in Goffstown
Great Boar's Head - in Hampton
Great Falls - former name of Somersworth
Green's Grant
Greenfield
Greenland
Greenland Station
Greenville
Groton
Groveton - in Northumberland
Guild - in Newport

H

Hadley - in Jaffrey
Hadley's Purchase
Hale's Location
Hampshire Road - in Salem
Hampstead
Hampton
Hampton Beach
Hampton Falls
Hampton Landing
Hancock
Hanover
Hanover Center
Happy Corner - in Pittsburg
Happy Valley - in Peterborough
Hardscrabble - in Lyme
Harrisville
Hart's Location
Hastings - in New London
Hatfield Corner - in Hopkinton
Haverhill
Hayes Corner - in Milton
Haynes Corner - in Exeter
Hazens - in Whitefield
Hebron
Hell Hollow - in Plainfield
Hemlock Center - in Charlestown
Henniker
Henniker Junction
High Bridge - in New Ipswich
Highlands - in Jefferson
Hill
Hill Center
Hills Corner - in Canterbury
Hills Corner - in Strafford
Hillsborough
Hillsboro Center
Hillsboro Lower Village
Hillsboro Upper Village
Hinsdale
Holderness
Hollis
Hollis Depot
Holton - in Deering
Hooks Crossing - in Auburn
Hooksett
Hopkinton
Hornetown - in Farmington
Horse Corner - in Chichester
Howards Grove - in Derry
Hubbard - in Derry
Hudson
Hudson Center

I

Idlewilde - in Pittsburg
Interlaken Park - in Laconia
Intervale - in Conway and Bartlett
Ireland - in Landaff

J

Jackson
Jackson Falls
Jady Hill - in Exeter
Jaffrey
Jaffrey Center
James City - in Deerfield
Jefferson
Jefferson Highland
Jericho - in Bartlett
Jericho - in Landaff
Jockey Hill - in Landaff
Johnson Corner - in Lyndeborough
Jones Corner - in Rindge
Jones Mills - in Gilmanton
Joslin - in Keene

K

Kearsarge - on Conway/Bartlett town line
Keene
Keewayden - in Wolfeboro
Kelleys Corner - in Gilmanton
Kelleys Corner - in Chichester
Kelleyville - in Newport
Kelwyn Park - on Rollinsford/Somersworth line
Kenison Corner - in Allenstown
Kensington
Keyes Hollow - in Lempster
Kidderville - in Colebrook
Kilkenny
Kingston
Klondike Corner - in New Boston

L

Laconia
Lake Shore Park - in Gilford
Lakeport - in Laconia
Lakeside - in New London
Lamprey Corners - in Kensington
Lancaster
Landaff
Landaff Center
Langdon
Langs Corner - in Rye
Laskey Corner - in Milton
Lawrence Corner - in Merrimack
Leavitt Park - in Meredith
Leavitts Hill - in Deerfield
Lebanon
Lee
Lee Five Corners
Lees Mill - in Moultonborough
Leighton Corners - in Ossipee
Leighton Corners - in Strafford
Lempster
Lincoln
Lincoln Park - in Nashua
Lisbon
Litchfield
Little Boars Head - in North Hampton
Littlefield - in Newfields
Littleton
Livermore
Lochmere - in Tilton
Lockehaven - in Enfield
Lockes Corner - in Barnstead
Londonderry
Long Sands - in Ossipee
Loon Cove - in Alton
Lost Nation - in Northumberland, on Lancaster town line
Loudon
Loudon Center
Lovejoy Sands - in Meredith
Loverens Mill - in Antrim
Low and Burbank's Grant
Lower Bartlett - in Bartlett
Lower Gilmanton - in Gilmanton
Lower Shaker Village - in Enfield
Lower Village - in Gilsum
Lower Village - in Sunapee
Lower Village - in Warner
Lyford Crossing - in Fremont
Lyman
Lyme
Lyme Center
Lyndeborough
Lynn - in Acworth

M

Madbury
Madison
Mallard Cove - in Laconia
Manchester
Maplehaven - in Portsmouth
Mapleton - in Stratford
Maplewood - in Bethlehem
Marlborough
Marlow
Marlow Junction
Marshall Corner - in Brentwood
Marshfield Station - in Thompson and Meserve's Purchase
Martin - in Hooksett
Martin Crossing - on Epping/Fremont town line
Martin's Location
Martins Corner - in Hooksett
Mascoma - in Lebanon
Mason
Masons - in Stratford
Massabesic - in Manchester
Mast Yard - in Concord
Meaderboro Corner - in Rochester
Meadowbrook - in Portsmouth
Meadows - in Jefferson
Melrose Beach - in Northwood
Melrose Corner - in Rochester
Melvin Mills - in Warner
Melvin Village - in Tuftonboro
Meredith
Meredith Center
Meredith Hill
Meriden - in Plainfield
Meriden Hill - in Columbia
Merrill Corners - in Farmington
Merrimack
Middleton
Middleton Corners
Milan
Milford
Mill Hollow - in Alstead
Mill Hollow - in Plainfield
Mill Village - in Plainfield
Mill Village - in Stoddard
Millsfield
Millville - in Salem
Milton
Milton Mills - in Milton
Mirror Lake - in Tuftonboro
Mittersill - in Franconia
Monahan Corners - in East Kingston
Monroe
Mont Vernon
Montcalm - in Enfield
Moultonborough
Moultonborough Falls
Moultonville - in Ossipee
Mount Major - in Alton
Mount Sunapee - in Newbury
Mountain Base - in Goffstown
Mountain Lakes - in Haverhill and Bath
Munsonville - in Nelson
Murray Hill - in Hill

N

Nashua
Nason Corners - in Hampton Falls
Nelson
New Boston
New Castle
New Durham
New Durham Corner
New Hampton
New Ipswich
New Ipswich Center
New London
New Portsmouth - in Middleton
New Rye - in Epsom
Newbury
Newfields
Newington
Newington Station
Newmarket
Newmarket - in Warner
Newport
Newton
Newton Junction - in Newton
Noone - in Peterborough
North Barnstead - in Barnstead
North Beach - in Hampton
North Branch - in Antrim
North Brookline - in Brookline
North Canaan - in Canaan
North Charlestown - in Charlestown
North Chatham - in Chatham
North Chester - in Chester
North Chichester - in Chichester
North Conway - in Conway
North Danville - in Danville
North Dorchester - in Dorchester
North Epping - in Epping
North Grantham - in Grantham
North Groton - in Groton
North Hampton
North Hampton Center
North Haverhill - in Haverhill
North Hinsdale - in Hinsdale
North Littleton - in Littleton
North Londonderry - in Londonderry
North Newport - in Newport
North Nottingham - in Nottingham
North Pelham - in Pelham
North Pembroke - in Pembroke
North Richmond - in Richmond
North Rochester - in Rochester
North Salem - in Salem
North Sanbornton - in Sanbornton
North Sandwich - in Sandwich
North Stratford - in Stratford
North Sutton - in Sutton
North Swanzey - in Swanzey
North Village - in Peterborough
North Wakefield - in Wakefield
North Walpole - in Walpole
North Weare - in Weare
North Wilmot - in Wilmot
North Wolfeboro - in Wolfeboro
North Woodstock - in Woodstock
Northfield
Northfield Station
Northumberland
Northwood
Northwood Center
Northwood Narrows
Northwood Ridge
Notchland - in Hart's Location
Nottingham
Nottingham Square
Nutter - in Bath
Nuttings Beach - in Hebron

O

Odell
Onway Lake - community in Raymond
Orange
Orford
Orfordville - in Orford
Ossipee
Ossipee Lake Shores - in Ossipee
Ossipee Valley
Otterville - in New London

P

Pages Corner - in Dunbarton
Pages Corner - in Fremont
Pages Corner - in New London
Pannaway Manor - in Portsmouth
Paris - in Dummer
Park Hill - in Westmoreland
Parker - in Goffstown
Parker Hill - in Lyman
Parkman Corner - in Stratham
Passaconaway - in Albany
Pearls Corner - in Loudon
Pelham
Pembroke
Pembroke Hill
Penacook - in Concord
Pendleton Beach - in Laconia
Peppermint Corner - in Derry
Pequawket - in Tamworth
Percy - in Stark
Perham Corner - in Lyndeborough
Perhams Four Corners - in Hudson
Peterborough
Pettyboro - in Bath
Pickering - in Rochester
Pierce Bridge - in Bethlehem
Piermont
Pike - in Haverhill
Pinardville - in Goffstown
Pine Cliff - in Newbury
Pine Grove Park - in Salem
Pine River - in Effingham
Pinkham's Grant
Piscataqua - in Newington
Pittsburg
Pittsfield
Place - in Farmington
Plaice Cove - in Hampton
Plainfield
Plaistow
Plymouth
Pollys Crossing - in Ossipee
Ponemah - in Amherst
Poocham - in Westmoreland
Portsmouth
Portsmouth Plains
Potash Corner - in Hudson
Potter Place - in Andover
Powwow River - in East Kingston
Pratt - in Mason
Pratts Corners - in Plainfield
Prescott Corner - in Kensington
Province Lake - in Wakefield
Puckershire - in Claremont
Purmort - in Enfield

Q

Quaker City - in Unity
Quebec Junction - in Carroll 
Quincy - in Rumney
Quint - in Conway
Quinttown - in Orford

R

Rand - in Rindge
Randolph
Randolph Hill
Raymond
Redstone - in Conway
Reeds Ferry - in Merrimack
Richmond
Rindge
Rings Corner - in Pittsfield
Rivercrest - in Hanover
Riverdale - in Weare
Riverhill - in Concord
Riverside - in Seabrook
Riverton - in Jefferson
Robinson Corner - in Grafton
Roby - in Warner
Roby Corners - in Springfield
Rochester
Rockingham - in Newfields
Rockwood - in Fitzwilliam
Rockywold - in Holderness
Rogers Crossing - in Bartlett
Roland Park - in Ossipee
Rollinsford
Rollinsford Station
Roundys Corner - in Gilsum
Rowes Corner - in Hooksett
Rowes Corner - in Newton
Roxbury
Roxbury Center
Rumney
Rumney Depot
Russell - in Greenfield
Ryder Corner - in Croydon
Rye
Rye Beach
Rye North Beach

S

Sabattus Heights - in Loudon
Sachem Village - in Lebanon
Salem
Salem Depot
Salisbury
Salisbury Heights
Samoset - in Gilford
Sanborn - in Hampton Falls
Sanborn Corners - in Hampton Falls
Sanbornton
Sanbornville - in Wakefield
Sandown
Sandwich
Sandwich Landing
Sargent Corners - in Newton
Sargent's Purchase
Savageville - in Lisbon
Sawyers - in Dover
Sawyers River - in Hart's Location
Scates Corner - in Randolph
Scotland - in Winchester
Scott - in Dalton
Scribners Corner - in Salisbury
Seabrook
Seabrook Beach - in Seabrook
Seabrook Station - in Seabrook
Second College Grant
Severance - in Auburn
Shaker Village - in Canterbury
Sharon
Shaws Corner - in Surry
Shelburne
Shingle Mill Corner - in Sutton
Short Falls - in Epsom
Silver Lake - in Madison
Slab City - in Weare
Smith Colony - in Hampton
Smith Corner - in South Hampton
Smiths Corner - in Salisbury
Smithtown - in Seabrook
Smithville - in New Ipswich
Snowville - in Eaton
Snumshire - in Charlestown
Snyders Hill - in Webster
Somersworth
South Acworth - in Acworth
South Alexandria - in Alexandria
South Barnstead - in Barnstead
South Barrington - in Barrington
South Bow - in Bow
South Brookline - in Brookline
South Charlestown - in Charlestown
South Chatham - in Chatham
South Conway - in Conway
South Cornish - in Cornish
South Danbury - in Danbury
South Danville - in Danville
South Deerfield - in Deerfield
South Effingham - in Effingham
South Hampton
South Hemlock - in Charlestown
South Hooksett - in Hooksett
South Keene - in Keene
South Kingston - in Kingston
South Lancaster - in Lancaster
South Lee - in Lee
South Lyndeborough - in Lyndeborough
South Merrimack - in Merrimack
South Milford - in Milford
South Newbury - in Newbury
South Newington - in Newington
South Seabrook - in Seabrook
South Stoddard - in Stoddard
South Sutton - in Sutton
South Tamworth - in Tamworth
South Weare - in Weare
South Wolfeboro - in Wolfeboro
Spofford - in Chesterfield
Spragueville - in Swanzey
Spring Haven - in Alton
Springfield
Springfield Junction - in Charlestown
Squag City - in Cornish
Squantum - in Jaffrey
Stark
Starr King - in Jefferson
State Landing - in Moultonborough
State Line - in Fitzwilliam
Stewartstown
Stewartstown Hollow
Stinson Lake - in Rumney
Stockbridge Corner - in Wolfeboro
Stockbridge Corners - in Alton
Stoddard
Stoneham Corners - in Brookfield
Strafford
Strafford Corner
Stratford
Stratham
Stratham Station - on Stratham/Greenland town line
Success
Sugar Hill
Suissevale - in Moultonborough
Sullivan
Sunapee
Sunapee Station
Suncook - on Pembroke/Allenstown town line
Surry
Sutton
Swanzey
Swanzey Station
Swetts Mills - in Webster
Swiftwater - in Bath

T

Tamworth
Tappan Corners - in East Kingston
Tavern Village - in Weare
Temple
The Five Corners - in Hampton
The Glen - in Pittsburg
The Plains - in Tilton
The Plantation - in Hampton
The Willows - in Hampton
Thomas - in Rindge
Thompson and Meserve's Purchase
Thompson Corner - in Salisbury
Thornton
Thorntons Ferry - in Merrimack
Tilton
Tinkerville - in Columbia
Tinkerville - in Lyman
Towles Corner - in South Hampton
Town Hall Corner - in Hampton Falls
Town House - in Milton
Trapshire - in Charlestown
Troy
Tuftonboro
Twin Lake Village - on New London/Springfield town line
Twin Mountain - in Carroll
Tyler - in Hopkinton

U

Union - in Wakefield
Union Wharf - in Tuftonboro
Unity
Upper Kidderville - in Colebrook
Upper Shaker Village - in Enfield
Upper Village - in Bath
Upper Village - in Gorham

W

Wadley Falls - in Lee
Wakefield
Wallis Sands - in Rye
Walpole
Warner
Warren
Washburn Corner - in Springfield
Washington
Water Village - in Ossipee
Waterloo - in Warner
Waterville Valley
Waumbek Junction - in Jefferson
Wawbeek - in Tuftonboro
Weare
Weare Corner - in Seabrook
Weares Mill - on Seabrook/Hampton Falls town line
Webb - in Marlborough
Webster
Webster Lake - in Franklin
Webster Place - in Franklin
Websters Mill - in Chichester
Weirs Beach - in Laconia
Welsh's Corner - in Strafford
Wendell - in Sunapee
Wentworth
Wentworth Acres - in Portsmouth
Wentworth Terrace - in Dover
Wentworth Location
West Alton - in Alton
West Andover - in Andover
West Barrington - in Barrington
West Bath - in Bath
West Brookline - in Brookline
West Campton - in Campton
West Canaan - in Canaan
West Center Harbor - in Center Harbor
West Chesterfield - in Chesterfield
West Claremont - in Claremont
West Concord - in Concord
West Deering - in Deering
West Derry - in Derry
West Epping - in Epping
West Franklin - in Franklin
West Gonic - in Rochester
West Hampstead - in Hampstead
West Henniker - in Henniker
West Hollis - in Hollis
West Hopkinton - in Hopkinton
West Kingston - in Kingston
West Lebanon - in Lebanon
West Milan - in Milan
West Nottingham - in Nottingham
West Ossipee - in Ossipee
West Peterborough - in Peterborough
West Plymouth - in Plymouth
West Rindge - in Rindge
West Rumney - in Rumney
West Rye - in Rye
West Salisbury - in Salisbury
West Springfield - in Springfield
West Stewartstown - in Stewartstown
West Swanzey - in Swanzey
West Thornton - in Thornton
West Unity - in Unity
West Wilton - in Wilton
West Windham - in Windham
Westmoreland
Westmoreland Depot
Westport - in Swanzey
Westville - in Plaistow
Whiteface - in Sandwich
Whitefield
Whittier - in Tamworth
Wilder - in New Ipswich
Wildwood - in Easton
Wilmot
Wilmot Flat
Wilson - in Londonderry
Wilson Corners - in Salem
Wilton
Wilton Center
Winchester
Windham
Windham Depot
Windsor
Winniconic - in Stratham
Winnicut Mills - in Stratham
Winnipesaukee - in Moultonborough
Winnisquam - at Sanbornton/Tilton/Belmont junction
Winona - in New Hampton
Wolfeboro
Wolfeboro Center
Wolfeboro Falls
Wonalancet - in Tamworth
Woodland Park - in Merrimack
Woodlands - in Alton
Woodman - in Wakefield
Woodmere - in Rindge
Woods Mill - in Stoddard
Woodstock
Woodsville - in Haverhill

See also 
:Category:Fictional populated places in New Hampshire
Defunct placenames of New Hampshire
List of cities and towns in New Hampshire
List of counties in New Hampshire
List of New Hampshire locations by per capita income
National Register of Historic Places listings in New Hampshire

 
New Hampshire
New Hampshire geography-related lists